Liberty Island is a mostly-flooded island in the Sacramento–San Joaquin River Delta, in Solano County, California. It is administered by Reclamation District 2093.

Gallery

References

Islands of Solano County, California
Islands of the Sacramento–San Joaquin River Delta
Islands of Northern California